Dermot (Gunn) O'Mahony (2 April 1881 – 22 April 1960) was an Irish politician and farmer. He was first elected to Dáil Éireann as a Cumann na nGaedheal Teachta Dála (TD) for the Wicklow constituency at the June 1927 general election. He was re-elected at the September 1927, 1932 and 1933 general elections. He was re-elected at the 1937 general election as a Fine Gael TD. He lost his seat at the 1938 general election.

His father Pierce Charles de Lacy O'Mahony was an Irish Parliamentary Party Member of Parliament (MP) for North Meath from 1886 to 1892, and his great-grandfather Pierce Mahony was a Repeal MP for Kinsale from 1837 to 1838.

See also
Families in the Oireachtas

References

1881 births
1960 deaths
Cumann na nGaedheal TDs
Fine Gael TDs
Members of the 5th Dáil
Members of the 6th Dáil
Members of the 7th Dáil
Members of the 8th Dáil
Members of the 9th Dáil
Politicians from County Wicklow
Irish farmers